Ya Hero Ya Mero is the debut studio album by German rapper Mero. The album was released on 15 March 2019, through Groove Attack TraX.

The album produced three singles, "Baller los", "Hobby Hobby" and "Wolke 10", all of which reached number one in Germany and Austria. Every single was supported by a music video. The album debuted at number one in Germany and entered the album charts in Belgium and the Netherlands.

Background
In 2017, Mero started gaining popularity by posting rap tracks on his social media, especially on Instagram. To date, his account attained over one million followers. In May 2018, he was signed to the label Groove Attack TraX by rapper Xatar. His debut single "Baller los" was released in November 2018 and instantly reached number one in Germany and Austria. Ya Hero Ya Mero was announced alongside the single release. Over the course of the next four months, he released two more singles, "Hobby Hobby" and "Wolke 10", both of which reached number one in Germany and Austria. On 21 February, Mero released a teaser promoting the album. Upon release, all of the album tracks entered the German single charts with three of them ("Jay Jay", "Träume werden wahr" and "Wie Buffon") reaching the Top 10.

Track listing
Credits adapted from Tidal.

Charts

Weekly charts

Year-end charts

Release history

References

2019 debut albums